Lee Hyo-kun (이효근, born 7 August 1967) is a South Korean fencer. He competed in the sabre events at the 1988 and 1996 Summer Olympics. He is the coach of the woman's sabre team of South Korea.

References

External links
 

1967 births
Living people
South Korean male sabre fencers
Olympic fencers of South Korea
Fencers at the 1988 Summer Olympics
Fencers at the 1996 Summer Olympics
Asian Games medalists in fencing
Fencers at the 1990 Asian Games
Fencers at the 1994 Asian Games
Asian Games silver medalists for South Korea
Medalists at the 1990 Asian Games
Medalists at the 1994 Asian Games